The 2017–18 Montenegrin Second League was the 12th season since the establishment of the Montenegrin Second League. The season ran from 13 August 2017 to 26 May 2018.

Format of competition
A total of 12 teams participated in this edition of the Second League. The new members were FK Lovćen, FK Jedinstvo and FK Bokelj who was relegated from 2016–17 Montenegrin First League, and winners of Montenegrin Third League playoffs - OFK Mladost Lješkopolje.
This was the last season of Second CFL with 12 participants, as the participants would be reduced to 10. At the end of the season, three worst-placed teams on the table would be directly relegated to the Montenegrin Third League.

Teams

The following 12 clubs competed in this season.

League table

Results
The schedule consists of three rounds. During the first two rounds, each team played each other once home-and-away for a total of 22 games. The pairings of the third round were then set according to the standings after the first two rounds, giving every team a third game against each opponent for a total of 33 games per team.

First and second round

Third round

Promotion play-offs
The 3rd-placed team (against the 10th-placed team of the First League) and the runners-up (against the 11th-placed team of the First League) will both compete in two-legged promotion play-offs after the end of the season.

Summary

Matches

Lovćen won 2–1 on aggregate.

Petrovac won 5–2 on aggregate.

Top scorers

References

External links
Football Association of Montenegro - Official Site

Montenegrin Second League seasons
Montenegro
2017–18 in Montenegrin football